Bill Weston (29 May 1941 - 25 March 2012) was a British stunt performer and actor, whose 40-year career includes credits for Saving Private Ryan, Titanic, Raiders of the Lost Ark, The Living Daylights and Batman Begins.

Filmography

Film

Television

References

External links 
Bill Weston at the Internet Movie Database

1941 births
2012 deaths
English stunt performers